Maurice Carnell IV (born October 12, 1994) is a professional Canadian football defensive back for the Toronto Argonauts of the Canadian Football League (CFL).

University career
Carnell first played college football for the Grossmont College Griffins from 2014 to 2015. He then transferred to the University of North Alabama to play for the Lions in 2016 and 2017. With the Lions, he played in 23 games where he had 64 tackles, six interceptions, one forced fumble, and one fumble recovery.

Professional career

Toronto Argonauts
Carnell signed with the Toronto Argonauts on June 3, 2018, well after the team had started training camp. He played in one preseason game, but was released shortly after on June 9, 2018.

Hamilton Tiger-Cats
On May 2, 2019, Carnell signed with the Hamilton Tiger-Cats. Following training camp, he was added to the team's practice roster where he spent most of the 2019 season. He made his professional debut in the last game of the regular season on November 2, 2019. He was re-assigned to the practice roster for the playoffs and did not play in the team's 107th Grey Cup loss to the Winnipeg Blue Bombers. It was announced on December 19, 2019, that Carnell had re-signed with the Tiger-Cats, but did not play in 2020 due to the cancellation of the 2020 CFL season.

Carnell re-signed with the Tiger-Cats on June 29, 2021, but was released in training camp on July 19, 2021.

Toronto Argonauts (II)
On April 5, 2022, Carnell signed with the Toronto Argonauts, but was released with the final cuts on June 5, 2022. He re-signed with the team on August 9, 2022. Soon after his signing, Carnell played in his first game as an Argonaut against his former team, the Hamilton Tiger-Cats, on August 12, 2022, as a back up defensive back. In the team's next game, he started at halfback and recorded his first career interception, on August 20, 2022, against the Calgary Stampeders. He continued to start in the secondary and scored his first career touchdown on September 24, 2022, in a game against the Ottawa Redblacks, when he intercepted Caleb Evans and returned the ball 35 yards for the score. In that same game, he also recorded his first multiple interception game since he had picked off Nick Arbuckle earlier in the game.

Personal life
Carnell was born to parents Johnisha Carnell and Maurice Carnell III. He has two brothers and one sister.

References

External links
Toronto Argonauts bio 

1994 births
Living people
American football defensive backs
Canadian football defensive backs
Hamilton Tiger-Cats players
North Alabama Lions football players
Players of American football from San Diego
Players of Canadian football from San Diego
Toronto Argonauts players